Jenny Gago (born September 11, 1953) is a Peruvian-American actress best known as Maria in Knots Landing (1984-1986), Maria in My Family (1995), Anaya in The Agency (2002-2003), and Det. Ochoa in Southland (2011).

Life 
Gago was born in Peru. She earned a Bachelor Degree in Theatre Arts from UCLA and attended the Lee Strasberg Theatre and Film Institute on a scholarship. She has a son.

Career 
In 1981, Gago began her acting career. Roles in television shows including Captain Santina on MacGyver, Detective Beatrice Zapeda in Alien Nation, Anaya on The Agency, and Grandma on Freddie. TV guest appearances include Falcon Crest, Remington Steele, Chicago Hope, The Pretender, Ally McBeal, Crossing Jordan, Lost, and The Closer.

Gago had recurring roles on the shows General Hospital, Knots Landing, The Agency, Southland (with Regina King), and Freddie (with Freddie Prinze Jr.). She appeared in the show Alien Nation, as well as its film franchise, playing the role of Detective Beatrice Zapeda.

The National Council of La Raza honored her as a positive role model the Image Awards, she was honored by the Association for the Advancement of Mexican-Americans, the Hispanic Women's Network of Texas, and won a Golden Eagle Award for Old Gringo in 1989. Gago played the role of Detective Josie Ochoa on the third season of TNT's Southland.

Gago's film appearances include Innerspace, The Tie That Binds, and Nurse Betty and in the film My Family (with Esai Morales).

Filmography

Television credits

References

External links
 

American television actresses
American film actresses
Peruvian emigrants to the United States
1953 births
Living people
UCLA Film School alumni
Lee Strasberg Theatre and Film Institute alumni
20th-century American actresses
21st-century American actresses
Place of birth missing (living people)